Nai River or River Null is a river in Tai'an, Shandong Province, China. 
It merges into Dawen River, then empties into Dongping Lake. 
The river flows through the city of Taian.

See also
List of rivers in China

References 

Rivers of Shandong